The O’Connor Justice Prize, named for former United States Supreme Court Justice Sandra Day O’Connor, was established in 2014 to raise visibility for rule-of-law initiatives; recognize people who have made extraordinary contributions to advancing the rule of law, justice, and human rights; and to honor O’Connor's legacy.

A group led by former Arizona Supreme Court Justice Ruth McGregor, who served as a law clerk for O’Connor from 1981 to 1982, developed the prize to honor O’Connor's legacy. The prize is administered by the Sandra Day O’Connor College of Law at Arizona State University.

Honorees 
2014: Navanethem “Navi” Pillay, United Nations High Commissioner for Human Rights
2016: Ana Palacio, member of the Council of State of Spain and former Senior Vice President and General Counsel of the World Bank Group
2017: Jimmy Carter, 39th President of the United States
2018: Anson Chan, former Chief Secretary for Administration for the Hong Kong Special Administrative Region
2019: FW de Klerk, former President of South Africa
2020: Nadia Murad, Yazidi human rights activist

References 

Civil awards and decorations of the United States